This is a list of provinces of Equatorial Guinea by Human Development Index as of 2021.

See also 

 List of countries by Human Development Index

References 

Equatorial Guinea
Equatorial Guinea
Economy of Equatorial Guinea